Yakinskaya is a rural locality (a village) in Ilezskoye Rural Settlement, Tarnogsky District, Vologda Oblast, Russia. The population was 12 as of 2002.

Geography 
Yakinskaya is located 38 km northeast of Tarnogsky Gorodok (the district's administrative centre) by road. Karchevskaya is the nearest rural locality.

References 

Rural localities in Tarnogsky District